Pallacanestro Treviso, named Benetton Basket due to a long running sponsorship by the Benetton Group and widely referred to as Benetton Treviso, is an Italian youth basketball club based in Treviso, Veneto.

The club was previously a successful professional club until 2012 when the Benetton Group decided to withdraw from professional basketball, though they retained the youth section at La Ghirada, the sports complex they own. For past club sponsorship names, see sponsorship names.

History
Founded in 1954 as Duomo Folgore, it remained in obscurity for the first few decades of its existence though it did reach the first division Lega Basket Serie A in 1962. However the club only stayed there one season, finishing the league in last place, after which it was hampered by financial problems.

Duomo Folgore was renamed Associazione Pallacanestro Treviso sometime during the 1970s, with new ownership.
It then moved up the divisions, reaching the national Serie A2 in 1979.
In 1980-81 the team finished third in the league, earning a return to the Serie A.

The Benetton Group started sponsoring the club during the 1981-82 season, which ended with a relegation to the A2.
The following year, Benetton would become the majority owners of Pallacanestro Treviso, moving into the newly constructed PalaVerde, owned and financed by the family.
Promoted in 1985, it stayed in Serie A one-season before going back down. Another promotion followed in 1987, this one would see the club start a permanent stay in the elite.

In 1991, the club legally became Pallacanestro Treviso (it was commonly called Benetton Treviso at the time), with its status changing from an association to a limited liability company (s.r.l.).
That year would spark a new era for Benetton Basket, with the arrival of the legendary Toni Kukoč from the three-peat European Champions of POP 84, but also of Stefano Rusconi from Cagiva Varese and Nino Pellacani, the team would beat Scavolini Pesaro to win their first Serie A title in 1992.

The next season, Benetton won the Italian Cup and reached the Final Four of the FIBA European League (Europe's elite continental competition) that take place in Peace and Friendship Stadium, Piraeus, and in the semifinal defeated PAOK 79–77. In the final, Benetton although it was the favorite of the match, lost to Limoges CSP 55–59.

Though Kukoč left for the NBA in the summer, Riccardo Pittis joined the club that won another Italian Cup that year.
They would win their first European title, the FIBA European Cup against Taugrés, in 1995, thanks to players such as Orlando Woolridge and Petar Naumoski, and also became third successive Italian Cup that garnished the trophy cabinet.

Benetton added another Serie A title in 1997, a second FIBA Saporta Cup in 1999 against Pamesa Valencia, and an Italian cup in 2000.
During the 2001–02 season they won the Italian Supercup and the league.
The next year they did even better with a treble, winning the Supercup, Cup and league but they didn't manage to won the Euroleague title defeated in the final by FC Barcelona.

Adding more league titles after that, Benetton Basket reached the Euroleague Final Four on a few occasions but never managed to win the title.

Struggles 

In February 2011, the Benetton family announced they would be withdrawing their support for professional basketball, effectively calling time on Treviso's top flight status if no other backer could be found.

Well-wishers such as former players Paolo Vazzoler and Pittis tried to rouse support for a new club, Treviso Basket 2012. However their application to take Benetton Basket's place in the Serie A was rejected.

Since then Benetton Basket has focused only on youth development, with the Under 17 squad their most senior.
Treviso is represented in professional basket by Universo Treviso Basket - the renamed Treviso Basket 2012 - who, as of April 2022, play in the Lega Basket Serie A.

Honours
Total titles: (15)

Domestic competitions
 Italian League
 Winners (5): 1991–92, 1996–97, 2001–02, 2002–03, 2005–06
 Runners-up (4): 1992–93, 1994–95, 1998–99, 1999–00
 Italian Cup
 Winners (8): 1992–93, 1993–94, 1994–95, 1999–00, 2002–03, 2003–04, 2004–05, 2006–07
 Runners-up (2): 1991–92, 1997–98
 Italian Supercup
 Winners (4): 1997, 2001, 2002, 2006
 Runners-up (5): 1995, 2003, 2004, 2005, 2007

European competitions
 EuroLeague
 Runners-up (2): 1992–93, 2002–03
 3rd place (2): 1997–98, 2001–02
 Final Four (4): 1993, 1998, 2002, 2003
 FIBA Saporta Cup (defunct)
 Winners (2): 1994–95, 1998–99
 FIBA Korać Cup (defunct)
 Semifinalists (1): 1996–97
 EuroCup Basketball
 4th place (1): 2010–11

Other competitions
 FIBA International Christmas Tournament (defunct)
 4th place (1): 1991

Top performances in European & Worldwide competitions

Players

FIBA Hall of Famers

Notable players

2010's
 Brian Scalabrine  1/2 season: '11
 E'Twaun Moore  1/2 season: '11
 Jeff Adrien  1/2 season: '11
 Gal Mekel

2000's
 Donatas Motiejūnas 2 seasons: '09-'11
 Bobby Dixon 1&1/2 seasons: '08-'09, '10
 Pops Mensah-Bonsu 1 season: '07-'08
 Engin Atsür 1 season:'07-'08
 Nikos Zisis 2 seasons: '05-'07
 Drew Nicholas 1 season: '05-'06
 Marco Mordente 4 seasons:'04-'08
 Marcus Goree 3 seasons: '04-'07
 Ramūnas Šiškauskas 2 seasons: '04-06
 Andrea Bargnani 3 seasons: '03-'06
 Uroš Slokar 3 seasons: '03-'06
 Maurice Evans 1 season: '03-'04
 Jermaine Jackson 1 season: '03-'04
 Manuchar Markoishvili 2 season: '02-'04
 Trajan Langdon 1 season: '02-'03
 Sergei Chikalkin 1 season: '01-'02
 Charlie Bell 1 season: '01-'02
 Nikoloz Tskitishvili 1 season: '01-'02
 Andrés Guibert 1/2 season: '01
 Jorge Garbajosa 4 seasons: '00-'04
 Boštjan Nachbar 2 seasons: '00-'02
 Alan Tomidy 2 seasons: '00-'02
 Marcus Brown 1 season: '00-'01

1990's
 Tyus Edney 4 seasons: '99-'00, '01-'04
 Jeff Sheppard 1 season: '99-'00
 Marcelo Nicola 6 seasons: '98-'04
 Henry Williams 4 seasons: '95-'99
 Željko Rebrača 4 seasons: '95-'99
 Davide Bonora 4 seasons: '95-'99
 Petar Naumoski 2 seasons: '94-'95, '00-'01
 Orlando Woolridge 1 season: '94-'95
 Riccardo Pittis 11 seasons: '93-'04
 Winston Garland 1 season: '93-'94
 Rafael Addison 1 season: '93-'94
 Denis Marconato 12 seasons: '92-'95, '96-'05
 Terry Teagle 1 season: '92-'93
 Stefano Rusconi 7 seasons: '91-'98
 Toni Kukoč 2 seasons: '91-'93
 Vinny Del Negro 2 seasons: '90-'92

1980's
 Dan Gay 3 seasons: '88-'90
 Kyle Macy 2 seasons: '88-'89
 Mike Davis 1 season: '87-'88
 Mark Olberding 1 season: '87-'88
 Massimo Iacopini 10 seasons: '85-'95
 Massimo Minto 8 seasons: '82-'84, '85-'90

Head coaches
 Mario De Sisti (2 seasons: 1979-81)
 Piero Pasini (1 season: 1981-82)
 Gianmaria Conte (incomplete 1 season: 1982-83)
 Gianfranco Lombardi (incomplete 1 season: 1982-83)
 Mauro Di Vincenzo (1 season: 1983-84)
 Massimo Mangano (incomplete 2 seasons: 1984-86)
 Lajos Toth (incomplete 1 season: 1985-86)
 Riccardo Sales (incomplete 4 seasons: 1986-90)
 Emanuele Molin (incomplete 1 season: 1989-90)
  Petar Skansi (3 seasons: 1990-93)
 Fabrizio Frates (1 season: 1993-94)
  Mike D'Antoni (4 seasons: 1994-97, 2001–02)
 Željko Obradović (2 seasons: 1997-99)
 Piero Bucchi (2 seasons: 1999-01)
 Ettore Messina (3 seasons: 2002-05)
 David Blatt (2 seasons: 2005-07)
 Alessandro Ramagli (Sep.-Nov. 2007)
 Oktay Mahmuti (seasons: 2007-09)
 Jasmin Repeša (seasons: 2010-11)
 Aleksandar Đorđević (1 season: 2011-12)

Sponsorship names
Throughout the years, due to sponsorship, the club has been known as:
Faram Treviso (1977–1979)
Liberti Treviso (1979–1981)
Benetton Basket (1981–2012)

References

External links
 
2011–12 Eurocup profile

 
1954 establishments in Italy
Basketball teams established in 1954
Basketball teams in Veneto
Benetton Group
Sport in Treviso
Youth basketball